Asturias Airport,  is the only international airport of Asturias, Spain, in Castrillón. Traffic consists primarily of scheduled domestic flights and some seasonal scheduled international flights. In 2012, the airport handled 1,309,640 passengers and managed 13,252 operations. The airport is located in Anzu, parish of Santiago del Monte, municipality of Castrillón, 15 km from Avilés, 40 km from Gijón and 47 km from the regional capital, Oviedo.

History

The airport first opened on 11 June 1968. The first commercial route was established with Madrid and soon after another route came into operation, which linked Santiago de Compostela with Barcelona via Asturias and Bilbao.

In 1980, the airport underwent its first major expansion in preparation for the 1982 football World Cup in Spain. In 1982, the aircraft parking platform doubled in size. An additional 5 check-in desks were added to the existing ones. 2 boarding gates and 2 arrival gates, a new cafeteria-restaurant and several shops were also new additions.

In 2003, a series of improvements were made to the airport, that would enable it to handle a higher volume of passengers and aircraft traffic. Construction work on adding a second floor to the airport, that was accessible to passengers, was completed, and 3 Jet bridge jetways were also installed, allowing passengers to embark directly from the terminal building onto the aircraft.

Airlines and destinations
The following airlines operate regular scheduled and charter services to and from Asturias:

Statistics

Ground transport 
Road - The airport may be reached by both the A-8 motorway and the N-632 national road.
Bus - Alsa coach company offers a service between the airport and the cities of Avilés, Gijón and Oviedo. Some routes also stop in Piedras Blancas and Salinas.
Taxis - These are available at the airport.
Car Rental Services - Avis and Hello  Rent a Car.

References

External links 
  

Airports in Asturias
Transport in Asturias
Airports established in 1968